Rombly is a commune in the Pas-de-Calais département'' in the Hauts-de-France region of France.

Geography

Population

Places of interest
 The remains of a 14th-century castle donjon.

See also
Communes of the Pas-de-Calais department

References

Communes of Pas-de-Calais